The 2014 Blossom Cup was a professional tennis tournament played on outdoor hard courts. It was the sixth edition of the tournament and part of the 2014 ITF Women's Circuit, offering a total of $50,000 in prize money. It took place in Quanzhou, China, on 3–9 March 2014.

Singles main draw entrants

Seeds 

 1 Rankings as of 24 February 2014

Other entrants 
The following players received wildcards into the singles main draw:
  Sun Ziyue
  Tang Haochen
  Tian Ran
  Xu Shilin

The following players received entry from the qualifying draw:
  Liu Chang
  Michika Ozeki
  Varatchaya Wongteanchai
  Xu Yifan

The following player received entry into the singles main draw as a lucky loser:
  Polina Leykina

Champions

Singles 

  Zarina Diyas def.  Noppawan Lertcheewakarn 6–1, 6–1

Doubles 

  Chan Chin-wei /  Xu Yifan def.  Sun Ziyue /  Xu Shilin 7–6(7–4), 6–1

External links 
 2014 Blossom Cup at ITFtennis.com
 Official website

2014 ITF Women's Circuit
2014
2014 in Chinese tennis